The 2016 Engie Open de Seine-et-Marne was a professional tennis tournament played on indoor hard courts. It was the fourth edition of the tournament and part of the 2016 ITF Women's Circuit, offering a total of $50,000 in prize money. It took place in Croissy-Beaubourg, France, on 28 March – 3 April 2016.

Singles main draw entrants

Seeds 

 1 Rankings as of 21 March 2016.

Other entrants 
The following players received wildcards into the singles main draw:
  Joséphine Boualem
  Fiona Ferro
  Claire Feuerstein
  Andreea Mitu

The following players received entry from the qualifying draw:
  Olga Fridman
  Valentini Grammatikopoulou
  Tara Moore
  Julia Terziyska

The following player received entry by a junior exempt:
  Anna Blinkova

Champions

Singles

 Ivana Jorović def.  Pauline Parmentier, 6–1, 4–6, 6–4

Doubles

 Jocelyn Rae /  Anna Smith def.  Lenka Kunčíková /  Karolína Stuchlá, 6–4, 6–1

External links 
 2016 Engie Open de Seine-et-Marne at ITFtennis.com
 Official website 

2016 ITF Women's Circuit
2016 in French tennis
Open de Seine-et-Marne